The British Sports Journalism Awards are given annually in a number of categories. The category "Sports Scoop" has been awarded since 2010.

Sports Scoop of the Year winners 

 2018: tbc
 2017: Martha Kelner & Sean Ingle – The Guardian & Observer – Chris Froome failed drugs test
 2016: Daniel Taylor – The Guardian and Observer – Andy Woodward Sexual Abuse
 2015: Jonathan Calvert, George Arbuthnot, David Collins, The Insight Team – The Sunday Times – Doping Scandal: Sport's Dirtiest Secrets
 2014: Heidi Blake and Jonathan Calvert – Sunday Times – Plot to bust the World Cup
 2013: Mark Ogden – The Daily Telegraph
 2012: Lawrence Booth – The Daily Mail – Kevin Pietersen text scandal in England cricket
 2011: Mark Souster – The Times – Leaked document exposes England Rugby World Cup shame
 2010: Mazher Mahmood – News of the World – Pakistani spot-fixing scandal

References 

British journalism awards